Visitors to Egypt must obtain a visa from one of the Egyptian diplomatic missions unless they come from one of the visa exempt countries or countries that are eligible for visa on arrival. Visitors must hold passports that are valid for at least 6 months from the date of arrival to Egypt.

Visa policy map

Visa exemption
Citizens of the following 8 countries and territories may visit Egypt without a visa for 6 months (unless otherwise noted):

 

 (3 months)

 – at Borg El Arab Airport, Hurghada Airport or Sharm el Sheikh Airport if arriving on a charter flight
 (3 months)

The exemption for  citizens was suspended in July 2017, and it is currently unclear whether the exemption has been reinstated.

The visa-free regime also applies to the citizens of the following countries under certain conditions:
 – provided being aged 50 years and above or 16 years and below
 – provided being aged 14 years and below
 – 14 days in the Sinai Peninsula if entering through Taba Border Crossing or Sharm El Sheikh International Airport
 – if holding a normal 5-year passport, provided passport does not contain a stamp from the Jordanian Registration Office on the reverse side cover of the passport (3 months) (on page 60)
 – provided being aged 45 years and above or 18 years and below or being a female national.
 – provided being aged 50 years and above or 16 years and below (for all Egypt), visa not required for Alexandria and South Sinai (for all ages)
 – provided being aged 14 years and below
 – provided being aged 50 years and above or 16 years and below or being a female national
 – provided being aged 50 years and above or 16 years and below or being a female national
 – provided being aged 14 years and below
 – provided being aged 50 years and above or 16 years and below or traveling for medical reasons

Travel document issued by Egypt, Lebanon, Jordan and Syria to female Palestinian or to male Palestinian who are older than 40 years or younger than 18 years.

If travelling as part of the tourist group that consists of at least 5 persons citizens of  Azerbaijan, Barbados, Belize, Costa Rica, El Salvador, Guatemala, Honduras, India, Jordan, Kazakhstan, Lebanon, Moldova (except females aged between 15 and 35), Nicaragua, Russia, Saint Vincent and the Grenadines, and Turkey who hold a return ticket, booked accommodation, and a signed guarantee letter from a travel agency, do not require a visa for Egypt.

Visa exemption also applies to sons and daughters born to an Egyptian father (except nationals of Syria, Iraq, Yemen, and Qatar), to an Egyptian mother if born after 25 July 2004 (except nationals of Syria, Iraq, Qatar, and Yemen), and to wives of Egyptian nationals holding proof of marriage (except nationals of Syria, Iraq, Morocco, and Qatar).

Visa on arrival 

According to the Egyptian Consulate General in the United Kingdom, citizens of the following countries can obtain a visa upon arrival at any of the Egyptian ports of entry:

1 - Nationals of Belgium, France, Germany, Italy and Portugal can enter with a national ID card. They must bring a passport photo to be affixed to the visa.

On 17 December 2020, Ministry of Tourism and Antiquities of Egypt announced, on Twitter, that a decree has been activated that allows tourists holding valid visas from the US, the UK, or Schengen countries to apply for visa on arrival at airports in Egypt.

According to IATA, Citizens of  can stay for 15 days with a visa on arrival.

Citizens of  can obtain a visa on arrival if provided being aged 45 years and above or 20 years and below
 

Citizens of  can obtain a visa on arrival residence permit issued by Australia, Canada, USA and an EU Member state.

Citizens of  can obtain a visa on arrival by travelling with a tourist group with more than 5 people organised by an authorized travel agency. Visa on arrival can also be obtained by individuals, if the traveller is able to show (1) prove a hotel booking of a 4-5 star hotel, (2) sufficient cash value of more than 2000 USD and (3) a return ticket. 

According to data that the Egyptian Government provided to IATA, citizens of any country may obtain a visa on arrival to Egypt valid for 30 days,
Except for the citizens of the following 81 countries and territories.

Electronic visa 

From 3 December 2017 citizens of 46 countries may apply for tourist or business types of e-visa for 30 days online through the eVisa system.
 28 countries more were added from July 1, 2021, with North Korea apparently being removed back in 2018.

Sinai resorts permission stamp

According to the Egyptian Consulate General in the United Kingdom citizens of all European Union countries, the United States, and Israel (only through Taba Border Crossing) do not require a visa prior to travelling as a free entry permission stamp will be granted upon arrival if they are travelling to Sharm El Sheikh, Dahab, Nuweiba and Taba resorts only without leaving them and for a maximum of 14 days:

According to the data Egyptian Government provided to IATA citizens of all countries may obtain a Sinai resort visa on arrival at Sharm el-Sheikh, Saint Catherine or Taba airports valid for 15 days except for the citizens of the following 81 countries and territories: Afghanistan, Algeria, Angola, Armenia, Azerbaijan, Bangladesh, Barbados, Belarus, Belize, Bosnia and Herzegovina, Botswana, Burkina Faso, Burundi, Cameroon, Cape Verde, Central African Republic, Chad, Comoros, R Congo, DR Congo, Côte d'Ivoire, Djibouti, El Salvador, Equatorial Guinea, Eritrea, Ethiopia, Gabon, Gambia, Ghana, Guatemala, Guinea-Bissau, Honduras, India, Indonesia, Iran, Iraq, Kenya, DPR Korea, R Kosovo, Kyrgyzstan, Lesotho, Liberia, Madagascar, Malawi, Mali, Mauritania, Mauritius, Moldova, Mongolia, Montenegro, Morocco, Mozambique, Myanmar, Namibia, Nicaragua, Niger, Nigeria, Pakistan, Palestine, Philippines, Sierra Leone, Somalia, South Africa, Sri Lanka, St. Vincent and the Grenadines, Sudan, Swaziland, Syria, Tajikistan, Tanzania, Thailand, Togo, Tunisia, Turkey (except those aged below 20 and above 45), Turkmenistan, Uganda, Uzbekistan, Vietnam, Zambia and Zimbabwe.

Authorised visa required
According to the Egyptian Consulate General in the United Kingdom visitors holding passports of the following countries must apply for a visa in person and a visa approval must be sought for them from the proper authorities in Egypt and takes several weeks to process.

Transit without a visa
Holders of onward tickets can transit for a maximum time of 48 hours. This is not applicable to nationals of Iran who are required to hold a transit visa. Leaving the airport is permitted for passengers with transit time between 6 and 48 hours.  Passengers with transit time of less than 6 hours may leave the transit area but not the airport.  This is not applicable to nationals of Afghanistan, Lebanon, Palestine and Philippines who must remain in the transit area (airside) and must continue by the same or first connecting aircraft.

State Security approval
Citizens of the following countries need a prior approval from the Egyptian State Security Authorities in addition to holding a visa: 

This also applies to maids who are nationals of Bangladesh, India, Indonesia, Philippines and Thailand, and to citizens of Belize of Lebanese origin, of Bosnia and Herzegovina of Egyptian origin, of Algeria, Morocco, Tunisia if they require a visa, of China if their visa was issued outside China, of Sudan if they are residing outside Sudan, female citizens of Moldova aged between 15 and 35, male citizens of Palestine (and those holding a Jordanian passport with a stamp from the Jordanian Registration Office) Libya who require a visa.

Visa exemption for non-ordinary passports

Holders of the following diplomatic, official, service or special passports do not require a visa for Egypt:

D — diplomatic passports
O — official passports
S — service passports
Sp — special passports

See also

Visa requirements for Egyptian citizens

References

External links

Egypt e-Visa Portal

Egypt
Foreign relations of Egypt